The Montreal Jubilation Gospel Choir is a choir from Montreal, Quebec, Canada that sings primarily traditional and contemporary Gospel music. The choir's repertoire also includes a mix of music ranging from Gregorian chant to Bach chorales, traditional Zulu music and a modern Jazz: the oratorio.

History 

The choir was founded and directed by Trevor W. Payne in 1982 and gave its first performance at the St. James United Church in Montreal. The choir was founded to commemorate the 75th anniversary of Montreal's oldest black community church, Union United Church up the street from the Atwater Market on the corner of Delisle and Atwater, which borders the St. Henri and Little Burgundy neighborhoods.  The two other founding members were the Reverend Frank Gabourel, minister of the Union United Church, and Daisy Peterson Sweeney, the sister of Oscar Peterson, who taught both her brother Oscar Peterson and Oliver Jones to play the piano.  The first members primarily came from The Montreal Black Community Youth Choir, which existed between 1974-1981 and was also directed by Payne.   

In 1983 the choir signed with Justin Time Records, and in 1986 released a recording in with guest singer Salome Bey. In 1993 the MJGC performed on the Klaus König oratorio Song of Songs.  In 1995 their album Jubilation V: Joy to the World won a Juno.  They won the outstanding recording artist in 1987 by The Association of Gospel Music Ministries, and in 1989 they were named the best choral ensemble, and also won for best gospel album.  In the years 1993 to 1995 they were named vocal group of the year by the Canadian magazine Jazz Report.  The choir released a 25-year retrospective album in 2007, Jubilation XI - Looking Back, Vol. 2.

The Montreal Jubilation Gospel Choir has performed at gospel celebrations in Montreal and across Canada, the United States, and Europe.        

They have performed with such entertainers as Celine Dion, Ray Charles, New Kids on the Block, Oliver Jones, Martine St-Clair, and Salome Bey.  They have performed at many festivals, including the Montreal International Jazz Festival, the Stratford Festival of Canada, and Toronto's Harbourfront and International choral festival.  They have recorded a total of eleven CDs, some of which have won Juno Awards.

In 2017 Payne retired as director of the choir.

Discography

Montreal Black Community Youth Choir

 The Montreal Black Community Youth Choir (RCI 424)
 Goin' Up Yonder (Presqu'ile PE 13501)

Montreal Jubilation Gospel Choir

 Highway to Heaven (Justin Time JUST 10-2, 1986)
 Jubilation II (Justin Time JUST 21-2, 1988)
 Jubilation III - Glory Train (Justin Time JUST 35, 1990)
 Jubilation IV - A Capella (Justin Time JUST 46-2, 1992)
 Song of Songs (Enja ENJ-7057 2 1993)
 Jubilation V - Joy to the World (Justin Time JUST 54-2, 1994)
 Jubilation VI - Looking Back (Justin Time JUST 66/67-2, 1995)
 Jubilation VII - Hamba Ekhaya - Goin' Home (Justin Time JUST 96-2, 1997)
 Jubilation VIII - A Capella Plus (Justin Time JUST 167-2, 2001)
 Jubilation IX - Goin' Up Yonder (Justin Time JUST-183-2, 2002)
 Jubilation X - I'll Take You There (Justin Time JUST-215-2, 2005)
 Jubilation XI - Looking Back, Vol. 2 (Justin Time JTP 7502-2, 2008)

Awards 
Association of Gospel Music Ministries' Golden Note Award
 1987 Outstanding Recording Artist

Juno Awards
 1990 nominee, Best Roots and Traditional Album: Jubilation II
 1991 nominee, Best Roots and Traditional Album: Jubilation III - Glory Train
 1995 Best Blues/Gospel Album: Jubilation V - Joy To The World
 2003 nominee, Contemporary Christian/Gospel Album Of The Year: Jubilation VIII - A Capella Plus

References

External links 
 Montreal Jubilation Gospel Choir official site
 MJGC Myspace page

Black Canadian musical groups
Musical groups established in 1982
Canadian choirs
Musical groups from Montreal
Juno Award for Contemporary Christian/Gospel Album of the Year winners
1982 establishments in Quebec
Black Canadian culture in Quebec
Canadian gospel music groups
Juno Award for Blues Album of the Year winners
Justin Time Records artists
Black Canadian organizations